Hyderi is a surname among Muslims of Middle East and South Asia. It is derived from Ḥaydar ('Lion'), which was a title of Ali.

People with this name include:
Ali Sher Hyderi (died 2009), leader of the politico-religious organisation Sipah-e-Sahaba Pakistan
Shamsher-ul-Hyderi (1931–2012), Sindhi poet

References

See also 
 Lions in Islam
 Haidari, a suburb of Athens, Greece
 Haydari, salty yoghurt dish served as an appetiser
 Hyder (name)
 Hyderi, a neighbourhood in Karachi, Pakistan
 Hyderabad, a city in India
Ibrahim Hyderi, a fishing village in Karachi, Pakistan
 Ne'matullah Haidari, Afghan Border Police Commander-General

Surnames
Shi'ite surnames